The ACBF newsletter aims at providing news and facilitating the exchange of ideas of ACBF's capacity-building interventions in Africa.

External links 
 https://web.archive.org/web/20090626014814/http://www.acbf-pact.org/newsletter/

Newsletters